Ann-Christin Nykvist (born 4 April 1948) is a Swedish Social Democratic politician. She was minister for agriculture, food and consumer affairs in the Cabinet of Göran Persson. She holds a bachelor of Arts in economics from the Stockholm School of Economics. Prior to her appointment in 2002, she worked as the head of the Swedish Competition Authority.

References

External links
Information page on the Swedish Government web site

21st-century Swedish women politicians
1948 births
Living people
Swedish Social Democratic Party politicians
Stockholm School of Economics alumni
Swedish Ministers for Agriculture
Women government ministers of Sweden